Harrachov is a town in Jablonec nad Nisou District in the Liberec Region of the Czech Republic, close to the border with Poland. It has about 1,300 inhabitants. It is known for its ski resort.

Administrative parts
The town is made up of four town parts and villages: Harrachov, Mýtiny, Nový Svět and Ryžoviště.

Geography

It lies in the Giant Mountains. Part of the municipal territory belongs to Krkonoše National Park.

The Mumlava River flows through the town. Its confluence with the Jizera is situated on the municipal border. On the Mumlava there is the Mumlava Waterfall, the biggest and one of the most famous waterfalls in the Czech Republic.

History

Harrachov was established in the 17th century, after a glassworks was founded in the area of Ryžoviště, and originally was called just Dörf (German for "little village"). During the rule of Count Ferdinand Bonaventura Harrach (1701–1706), the settlement was renamed Harrachsdorf in his honor. The first written mention of Harrachov is from 1720. After a glassworks was founded also in the area of Nový Svět in 1711, the importance of Harrachov grew. The settlements of Nový Svět and Ryžoviště were founded around the glassworks in the mid-18th century. 

Since the end of the 19th century, Harrachov has been known for its glass production, textile industry, and mining. At the beginning of the 20th century, industrial production was bolstered by the construction of a cog railway line between Bohemian Tanvald via the Izera railway down to Silesian Hirschberg (present-day Jelenia Góra).

After World War II, the Silesian lands in the north fell to the Polish People's Republic according to the Potsdam Agreement and the border was closed. The German population was expelled and its property seized according to the Beneš decrees.

In 1958, the Communist governments of Czechoslovakia and Poland arranged a territorial exchange. Since the railway station located here was unusable for Poland after the interruption of cross-border traffic (the line to Jelenia Góra returned to Czechoslovak territory in a short section) and the local small settlements were almost inaccessible from the Polish side, the territories was exchanged. Czechoslovakia acquired the area around former Strickerhäuser (present-day Mýtiny). Poland was compensated by land in western Giant Mountains. In this way Harrachov acquired a railway station.

In 1921, the originally independent municipalities of Nový Svět and Rýžoviště joined Harrachov. In 1961, Mýtiny joined Harrachov.

From 1 January 2021, Harrachov is no longer a part of Semily District and belongs to Jablonec nad Nisou District.

Demographics

Transport

The European route E65 from Prague goes through the town. Koleje Dolnośląskie D21 line runs from Liberec to Szklarska Poręba via Harrachov-Mýtiny. There are three borders crossings with Poland: a railway crossing Harrachov / Jakuszyce, a road border crossing Harrachov / Jakuszyce, and a pedestrian border crossing Harrachov / Polana Jakuszycka.

Sport
Harrachov is one of the most popular Czech ski resorts including the internationally used Čerťák ski jumping hill (including flying hill); several winter sport events take place in Harrachov regularly. The whole region is increasingly important for alpine tourism in Central Europe.

Twin towns – sister cities

Harrachov is twinned with:
 Frenštát pod Radhoštěm, Czech Republic

See also
Groß Iser

References

External links

Official tourist portal
Map railway

 
Cities and towns in the Czech Republic
Ski areas and resorts in the Czech Republic